is a railway station in the town of Fujisaki, Aomori Prefecture, Japan, operated by the East Japan Railway Company (JR East).

Lines

Station layout
The station  has one side platform and one island platform serving three tracks, connected to the station building by a footbridge. The station has a Midori no Madoguchi staffed ticket office.

Platforms

Track 3 is used primarily for freight trains changing direction.

History
Kita-Tokiwa Station opened on 20 December 1924 as a station on the Japanese Government Railways (JGR), the pre-war predecessor to the Japanese National Railways (JNR). With the privatization of JNR on 1 April 1987, it came under the operational control of JR East.

Passenger statistics
In fiscal 2018, the station was used by an average of 421 passengers daily (boarding passengers only).

Station vicinity
 Aomori Shinkin Bank Tokiwa branch
 Mutsu Tokiwa Post Office (delivery and collection office)
 Tokiwa Taxi
 Hirosaki Police District Fujisaki Koban
 Fujisaki Municipal Meitoku Junior High School

See also
 List of Railway Stations in Japan

References

External links

  

Stations of East Japan Railway Company
Railway stations in Japan opened in 1924
Railway stations in Aomori Prefecture
Ōu Main Line
Fujisaki, Aomori